Ephraim Wilder Farley (August 29, 1817 – April 3, 1880) was a U.S. Representative from Maine.

Born in Newcastle, Maine, Farley attended the common schools and was graduated from Bowdoin College, Brunswick, Maine, in 1836.
He studied law.
He was admitted to the bar and commenced practice in Newcastle.
He served as member of the State house of representatives in 1843 and 1851–1853.

Farley was elected as a Whig to the Thirty-third Congress (March 4, 1853 – March 3, 1855).
He was an unsuccessful candidate for reelection in 1854 to the Thirty-fourth Congress.
He served as member of the State senate in 1856.
He died in Newcastle, Maine, April 3, 1880.
He was interred in a tomb on the family estate.

References

1817 births
1880 deaths
Bowdoin College alumni
Maine lawyers
People from Newcastle, Maine
Maine state senators
Whig Party members of the United States House of Representatives from Maine
19th-century American politicians
19th-century American lawyers